Leslie Lawrence 'Laurie' Shipp (27 September 1929 – 18 April 2020) was an Australian rules footballer who played with North Melbourne in the Victorian Football League (VFL).

Notes

External links 

2020 deaths
1929 births
Australian rules footballers from Victoria (Australia)
North Melbourne Football Club players
Moe Football Club players